The2016 NCAA Division II baseball tournament decided the champion of baseball in NCAA Division II for the 2016 season. the Nova Southeastern Sharks won their first national championship, beating the Millersville Marauders, both teams in their first College World Series. Nova Southeastern coach Greg Brown won his first title with the team, while NSU outfielder Kevin Suarez was named Tournament MOP.

Regionals

Atlantic Regional–West Chester, PA
Hosted by West Chester at Serpico Stadium.

Central Regional–St. Cloud, MN
Hosted by St. Cloud State at Joe Faber Field.

East Regional–Nashua, NH
Hosted by Franklin Pierce at Holman Stadium.

Midwest Regional–Quincy, IL
Hosted by Quincy at Quincy University Baseball Stadium.

South Regional–Tampa, FL
Hosted by Tampa at Tampa University Baseball Stadium.

Southeast Regional–Columbus, GA
Hosted by Columbus State at Ragsdale Field.

South Central Regional–Grand Junction, CO
Hosted by Colorado Mesa at Suplizio Field.

West Regional–Riverside, CA
Hosted by California Baptist at Riverside Sports Complex.

College World Series

Participants

Results

Bracket
Hosted by Mount Olive and Town of Cary at USA Baseball National Training Complex in Cary, NC.

Game results

References

Tournament
NCAA Division II Baseball Tournament
2016 in sports in North Carolina